UFC 217: Bisping vs. St-Pierre was a mixed martial arts event produced by the Ultimate Fighting Championship held on November 4, 2017, at Madison Square Garden in New York City, New York.

Background

The event was the second that the promotion has hosted at Madison Square Garden.

A UFC Middleweight Championship bout between current champion and The Ultimate Fighter 3 light heavyweight winner Michael Bisping and former two-time UFC Welterweight Champion Georges St-Pierre headlined this event. The bout was originally announced in March, but without a date attached. As time wore on the contest appeared to fall apart, with UFC President Dana White claiming Bisping would fight interim middleweight champion Robert Whittaker next and St-Pierre would get current welterweight champion Tyron Woodley. When Whittaker announced he was injured and Woodley put on a successful title defense against Demian Maia at UFC 214 in July that didn't meet White's standards, he reverted to the initial plan, which St-Pierre and Bisping said they wanted all along.

A UFC Bantamweight Championship bout between champion Cody Garbrandt and former champion T.J. Dillashaw, was previously scheduled to serve as headliner for UFC 213. However, Garbrandt withdrew from the fight due to a back injury. The fight was later rescheduled for this event.

A UFC Women's Strawweight Championship bout between champion Joanna Jędrzejczyk and former title challenger Rose Namajunas took place as the third title fight of the event.

Gadzhimurad Antigulov was expected to face Ion Cuțelaba at the event. However, Antigulov pulled out of the fight on September 26 citing an injury. He was replaced by promotional newcomer Michał Oleksiejczuk. In turn after the weigh-ins, Cuțelaba was pulled from the event by USADA due to a potential Anti-Doping Policy violation stemming from its investigation into voluntary disclosures by Cuțelaba during an out-of-competition sample collections on October 18 and October 19. He was provisionally suspended and the bout cancelled.

A heavyweight bout between Walt Harris and Mark Godbeer was initially slated for UFC 216. However, the fight was scrapped on the day of the event as Harris, was tabbed replacement opponent for Fabrício Werdum after his scheduled opponent Derrick Lewis pulled out of their fight with a back injury. The Harris/Godbeer pairing was rescheduled and took place at this event.

Patrick Cummins was expected to face The Ultimate Fighter: Team Edgar vs. Team Penn light heavyweight winner Corey Anderson at this event. However, on October 17, Cummins pulled out due to a resistant staph infection. He was replaced by former interim UFC Light Heavyweight Championship challenger Ovince Saint Preux.

Results

Bonus awards
The following fighters were awarded bonuses:
Fight of the Night: None awarded
Performance of the Night ($50,000): Georges St-Pierre, T.J. Dillashaw and Rose Namajunas 
Performance of the Night ($25,000): Ovince Saint Preux and Ricardo Ramos

Record set
Like UFC 33, UFC 205 and UFC 214, the card featured three title fights. However, this was the first time in UFC history that all three champions lost their belts on the same card.

See also
List of UFC events
2017 in UFC
Mixed martial arts in New York

References

Ultimate Fighting Championship events
Sporting events in New York City
2017 in mixed martial arts
Madison Square Garden
Sports in Manhattan
2017 in sports in New York (state)
2017 in sports in New York City
UFC 217